Association of Salesian Cooperators (ASC) is the movement of laity of the Salesian Family of Don Bosco and is the third order of the Salesian Order. It is also one of the three main branches of the Salesian Family founded directly by Don Bosco in 1876. The movement was created with the purpose to share the ideals of the Salesian Preventive System in the education of young people, especially those who are poorest, without the need to be a priest or a lay religious. According to a 2005's census, there are 26,703 persons affiliated to this movement around the world.

The ASC's superior is the Rector Major of the Salesians, inside a board of trust known as the World Council. Priests and bishops of the dioceses can join this movement, sharing the ideals and educative philosophies of Don Bosco.

History 

In 1873, Pope Pius IX approved the rules of the Salesian Society.

In the 1876 Annual Conference's report of the Society of Saint Francis de Sales, Don Bosco mentioned his plan to create the Association of Salesian Cooperators:

Don Bosco linked the development of the Salesian Bulletin to the foundation of the Cooperators:

In 1877 the Salesians did their first general chapter and Don Bosco reported the development of the cooperators and the Salesian Bulletin. He described the Association as people who wish to devote themselves to works of mercy in a specific rather than general way and he underlined that the mission of the cooperators is to take care of boys, who are exposed to immorality, catechizing them, keeping them happily busy on Sundays and holy days, finding them jobs with honest employers (...)

In the chapter, Don Bosco established the rules and missions of the cooperators and designed the way so any Catholic lay person, willing to join his educative mission in favor of poor young people, could join.

Notable members 
 Blessed Alexandrina of Balazar
 Venerable Dorotea de Chopitea
 Servant of God Matilde Salem
 Sean Devereux

References 

Salesian Order